The Outer Ring Road is a proposed 140 kilometer, 6-lane ring road expressway encircling the capital city of Patna, Bihar, India.

History
The area of Patna SCR (State Capital Region) will be spread over three districts of Patna, Vaishali and Saran district with this 4/6 lane highway project which has a length of 140 km and cost of 4800 crore. The expanses of Patna city will also reach the north of the Ganges river. Not only this, the way to spread the city of Patna on both sides of the Gandak river will open. It has been instructed to finalize the southern part of its DPR Ganga by July 31, 2019 and the northern part till September 15, 2019.

Route map
The new alignment of Patna Ring Road from Kanohli-Naubatpur-Ramnagar-Kachchidaragarh-Bidupur-Chaksikander crossing the Sarai NH-77 and SH-74 towards the north of the city of Hajipur, then crossing the Gandak river, NH-19, Dighwara There will be a new bridge on the Ganges River from Sherpur to Kanohali. The esitmated cost to build this ring-road is Rs 15000 crores.

Timeline
 August 2017: Bihar Government approved Patna outer ring road.
 October 2018: Central Government approved Patna outer ring road. It is part of special package announced by PM Narendra Modi.

Patna inner ring road
There is also DPR proposed for 65-km Patna inner ring road that includes a bridge between Dighwara in Saran district to Sherpur in Patna district and Kanhauli to Lakhna in Bihta-Sarmera road. The proposed alignment Patna ring road project is Bihta- Naubatpur- Dumri- Daniyawa- Kachchi Dargah- Bidupur- Hajipur- Sonepur- Digha- Bihta.

See also 
 Loknayak Ganga Path
 Digha–Sonpur Bridge
 Kacchi Dargah-Bidupur Bridge
 Patna–Digha Ghat line

References

Ring roads in India
Transport in Patna